Badminton at the 2013 Asian Youth Games was held in Sport Institute Gymnasium, Nanjing, China between 17 and 21 August 2013.

Medalists

Medal table

Results

Boys' singles

Girls' singles

Mixed doubles

References
Boys Results
Girls Results
Mixed Doubles Results

External links
Official website

2013 Asian Youth Games events
Asian Youth Games